This is about the university in Bangladesh.

Southeast University or SEU is a  private university in Banani and Tejgaon, Dhaka, Bangladesh. The university was established under the Private University Act, 1992 approved by the Government of the People's Republic of Bangladesh. Its permanent campus is in 251/A & 252, Tejgaon Industrial Area, Dhaka-1208, Bangladesh. SEU ranked 12th among Top Private universities in Dhaka Tribune's Private University Ranking 2019

In 2022 the university was ranked number one in the SCImago Institutions Rankings for Bangladesh.

History and administration 

Southeast University (SEU) was established in June 2002 as a private university under the Private University Act 1992. The president of Bangladesh is the chancellor. The university is run by a number of statutory bodies as required under the provisions of the Private University Act, 1992.

List of vice-chancellors 
 Prof. Dr. AFM Mafizul Islam ( present )

Programs
Southeast University offers the following undergraduate, post graduate programs and diploma courses:

School of Science & Engineering 

 Bachelor of Science in Architecture
 Bachelor of Science in Computer Science & Engineering
 Bachelor of Science in Electronics & Telecommunication Engineering
 Bachelor of Science in Electronic and Electrical Engineering
 Bachelor of Science in Textile Engineering
 Bachelor of Pharmacy

School of Business Studies 

 Bachelor of Business Administration
 Master of Business Administration (Regular)
 Master of Business Administration (Executive)
 Master of Business Administration (only for BBA students)

School of Arts and Social Science 

 1 year Master of Laws: 1 year LL.M
 2 year Master of Laws: 2 year LL.M
 4 year Bachelor of Laws: LL.B (Hons)
 2 year Bachelor of Laws: LL.B (Pass)
 Bachelor of English (Hons)
 Bachelor of Arts in Islamic Studies
 Master of Arts in Islamic Studies
 Bachelor of Arts in Bangla Studies
 Bachelor of Arts in Economics
 Master of Development Studies

Diploma courses 

 Diploma in Communicative English
 Postgraduate Diploma in World Trade Organization

Distance education
The distance education programs were discontinued to be compliant with the directives of Bangladesh Ministry of Education.

Library
Southeast University is linked with journal publishers through an international organisation named INASP/PERii. Bangladesh Academy of Sciences (BAS) is acting as the coordinating body.  This facility is IP based and work only within SEU campus. The SEU library offers regular services such as circulation, reference, counseling, indexing, bibliographical documentation, back up services, retrospective searches etc.

Southeast University has a library equipped with books on the academic programs offered as well as on research and extracurricular activities. The total collection of books and journals at is about 15000. It is a central library of the university rendering services to the students and faculty.

Terms and grading
Southeast University is modeled on the North American Open Credit system. It maintains tri-semester (term) year with the exception of the Department of Pharmacy which maintains a bi-semester year. Southeast University semester timeline is as follow:
 Spring: January - April (starting on the second Sunday of January)
 Summer: May - August (starting on the second Sunday of May)
 Fall: September - December (starting on the second Sunday of September)
Letter grades indicating the quality of course work completed are interpreted as follows:

Traditional class equivalent as per MOE, GOB, notification dated 02.06.2009: 
GPA 3.00-4.00= 1st class 
GPA 2.25-2.99= 2nd class 
GPA 1.65-2.24= 3rd class

Scholarships opportunities 
SEU offers partial to full tuition fee waiver based on outstanding HSC or A-Level result. But the result based waiver is not applicable in case of break of study. Also each semester the top ranked students from every department based on semester GPA gets partial financial assistance. Limited need based financial assistance program is available for students with more than 3.00 semester GPA. Children of Freedom Fighters are eligible for full tuition waiver & it remains valid in the subsequent semesters if the semester result is within the requirement.

Affiliations and membership
SEU has international relations and affiliations with other associations and universities around the world. SEU has international collaboration or MoU signed with these universities:

 University of Manchester, UK
 Yunnan University of Finance and Economics, China
 Wuhan Textile University, China
 Shinshu University, Japan
 Kunming University of Science and Technology, China

The university is member of some prestigious professional bodies including:

Institution of Engineers, Bangladesh (IEB) 
University Grants Commission of Bangladesh (UGC)
 Institute of Architects Bangladesh (IAB)
 Pharmacy Council of Bangladesh (PCB)

Notable people

Faculty
 Syed Alamgir, businessman

Alumni
 Bidya Sinha Saha Mim (Dhallywood actress)
 Pritom Hasan (actor)
 Keya Payel (actress)

References

External links 
 SEU Official Website
 SEU Official Facebook Page
 SEU Library's Website
 Department of Pharmacy

Private universities in Bangladesh
Educational institutions established in 2002
Universities and colleges in Dhaka
Private engineering universities of Bangladesh
Architecture schools in Bangladesh
2002 establishments in Bangladesh